Bowler is a British television sitcom which originally aired on ITV in a single series of 13 episodes between 29 July and 21 October 1973. A situation-comedy, it was a spin-off from The Fenn Street Gang featuring George Baker as East End criminal Stanley Bowler.

Released after serving a prison sentence, Stanley Bowler sets about trying to 'better' himself. The basic premise of the series revolves around Bowler's attempts to develop (and to project to others) a more-cultured personality, as he tries (but fails) to understand the fine arts, and to move into higher social circles.

Main cast
 George Baker as Stanley Bowler
 Fred Beauman as Reg
 Renny Lister as Doreen Bowler
 Gretchen Franklin as Mum
 Christopher Benjamin as Supt. Chamberlain
 Johnnie Wade as Nigel

References

External links

1973 British television series debuts
1973 British television series endings
1970s British comedy television series
ITV sitcoms
London Weekend Television shows
English-language television shows